Yagodny is a rural locality (a settlement) in Pevomaysky Selsoviet, Biysky District, Altai Krai, Russia. The population was 174 as of 2013. There are 5 streets.

Geography 
Yagodny is located 14 km north of Biysk (the district's administrative centre) by road. Pervomayskoye is the nearest rural locality.

References 

Rural localities in Biysky District